Boneh-ye Shir Mohammad (also Romanized as Boneh-ye Shīr Moḩammad) is a village in Lalar and Katak Rural District, Chelo District, Andika County, Khuzestan Province, Iran. At the 2006 census, its population was 196, in 31 families.

References 

Populated places in Andika County